The Hangzhou Library is a public library located at East Jiefang Road, Jianggan District of Hangzhou, Zhejiang. Hangzhou Library has a collection of over 2.8 million items, with 31 thousand newspapers, 40 thousand Republic of China-era books, 5058 ancient books, and 1 thousand and 4 hundred rubbings.

History
Hangzhou Library was established in July 1958 at Youth Road in Hangzhou.

In the mid-1980s, the library was relocated to Huansha Road.

In 1994, it was designated as a national first-grade library.

In 2003, it became a member of the International Federation of Library Associations and Institutions.

In October 2008, the Hangzhou Municipal Government appropriated 400 million yuan for constructing the new library.

In 2010, the library was listed among the second batch of the "Key Protection Units of Ancient Books in China" by the State Council of China.

References

External links 

Buildings and structures in Hangzhou
1958 establishments in China
Libraries established in 1958
Education in Hangzhou
Public libraries in Zhejiang